'Hathor is a goddess in ancient Egyptian mythology.

Hathor may also refer to
Hathor (month), a month of the Coptic calendar
Hathor (wherry), a Norfolk pleasure wherry
2340 Hathor, an asteroid
"Hathor" (Stargate SG-1), an episode of Stargate SG-1
Hathor, a Goa'uld character in Stargate SG-1
Hathor Exploration Limited, a junior uranium exploration company based out of Vancouver, British Columbia, Canada

See also
161 Athor, a Main-Belt asteroid